The Bao-Tavera Dam Complex refers to two earth-filled embankment dams located about  south of Santiago in Santiago Province of the Dominican Republic. It is the second tallest dam in the country behind the Monción Dam. A  canal connects each reservoir, making them a complex. The purpose of the complex is to provide municipal water, water for irrigation and to generate hydroelectric power. Water from the Tavera Reservoir is piped downstream to the Tavera Hydroelectric Plant which is situated on the right bank of the Bao River before it meets the Yaque del Norte River. The power station contains two 48 MW Francis turbine-generators for an installed capacity of 96 MW. Construction on the Tavera Dam began in September 1969 and it was completed on 27 September 1973. The Bao Dam was completed in 1981. The power station was upgraded from 80 MW to 96 MW in 1992.

See also

List of dams and reservoirs in Dominican Republic

References

Dams in the Dominican Republic
Hydroelectric power stations in the Dominican Republic
Dams completed in 1973
Dams completed in 1981
Energy infrastructure completed in 1973
Earth-filled dams
Santiago Province (Dominican Republic)